The 1999 BYU Cougars football team represented Brigham Young University in the 1999 NCAA Division I-A football season. The Cougars were led by 28th-year head coach LaVell Edwards, in what would be his second-to-last season with the team, and played their home games at Cougar Stadium. This was the school's first year in the newly formed Mountain West Conference, and they would go on to share the conference's first conference championship with Utah and Colorado State. They finished with a record of 8–4 (5–2 MW), and were invited to the 1999 Motor City Bowl, where they lost to undefeated Marshall, 3–21.

Schedule

Sources:

•SportsWest Productions (SWP) games were shown locally on KSL 5.

Roster

Rankings

Game summaries

Washington

Colorado State

Virginia

Utah State

Cal

New Mexico

UNLV

Air Force

San Diego State

Wyoming

Utah

Marshall

References

BYU
BYU Cougars football seasons
Mountain West Conference football champion seasons
BYU Cougars football